Topluca  is a village in Mut district of Mersin Province, Turkey. At  it is located to the east of Göksu River valley. The population of the village was 571 as of 2012.

References

Villages in Mut District